Smith & Mabley was an American veteran era importer of European automobiles and produced the American C. G. V. automobile in 1902, and the S & M Simplex automobile from 1904 to 1907, in New York City.

History 
A. D. Proctor Smith and his brother-in-law, Carlton R. Mabley founded Smith & Mabley in New York City in 1900 as an import company for European automobiles.  Vehicles from C. G. V., Panhard, Renault and Mors were imported, followed later by Mercedes and Isotta Fraschini.   In 1902 production of automobiles began under license from C. G. V. with the brand name of American C.G.V..   Production ended in 1903 after seven vehicles had been manufactured.

In 1903 Smith and Mabley, along with Winton was sued regarding infringement of the Selden Patent.  Later that year Winton and Smith & Mabley joined A.L.A.M. and the lawsuit was dropped.  In 1903 Smith & Mabley decided to start making vehicles again. They bought a seven-story plant on East 83rd Street.  G. Edward Franquist designed the plant and was both Chief Engineer and Superintendent of the factory.  Franquist attributed his engineering designs as being influenced by the finest European motor cars.  Franquist was a founding member of the S.A.E. and was the Simplex designer until 1915.  In 1903 Smith & Mabley offices and showroom and garage were located to a new building at 513-519 Seventh Avenue.

In 1903, Franquist designed a four-cylinder engine that was used on motor boats for racing including the Vingt-et-Un, Challenger and Dixie I. The Dixie I won the Harmsworth (British International) Trophy in 1907.  It was announced that motor boats and motor cars would begin production in May 1904.  The new marque name was S & M Simplex and the Smith & Mabley Manufacturing Company was set up for production..

A Smith & Mabley Simplex 75-hp racing car competed in the 1904 Vanderbilt Cup, owned and driven by Frank Croker.  Too many holes had been drilled in the frame to try to lighten the car, and it collapsed during the race seriously slowing his speed.  Croker was in his seventh round when the race was stopped.  Frank Croker and his mechanic were killed during a speed run in his S & M Simplex racer on the Ormond-Daytona Beach in 1905, while swerving to avoid a motorcycle. 

Production of the S & M Simplex ran until early 1907.  A total of over 220 vehicles were built.  Smith & Mabley suffered during the recession and stock market slides in late 1906 that led up to the Panic of 1907.  Receivers were called in and the company would be declared bankrupt in 1907.  Friend and textile importer Herman Broesel, Sr., took over the Smith & Mabley assets in 1907 and formed the Simplex Automobile Company, and continued production as the Simplex .

American C.G.V. 
Smith & Mabley were importers of the Charron, Girardot & Voigt motor car made in France.  In 1902 and early 1903, the company produced the car under license.  Seven cars, with tonneau bodies supplied by the coach builders J.M. Quinby & Sons and assembled by the Rome Locomotive Works in Rome, New York were built. The brand name was American C. G. V. and the price as a five-passenger tonneau was $5,500, .  After the short production run, Smith & Mabley returned to importing the C. G. V.

S & M Simplex 
All S & M Simplex's were powered by 4-cylinder engines.  The first model from 1904 was the 30/35 HP with a T-head engine.   Engine power was transmitted to the rear axle through a four-speed gearbox and chains.  Its chassis had a wheelbase of 105-inches. The open touring car offered space for five people.  In the same year, the smaller 18 HP was added to the range, although there was less demand for it.  It had a wheelbase of 91-inches and a choice of a two-seat runabout or a five-seat tonneau.

In 1905 only the 30/35hp was offered. The wheelbase was extended to 106-inches on a Brougham body style.  In 1906 the car was described as a 30 HP, available with a wheelbase of 106-inches a five-seat touring car and with a wheelbase of 113-inch as a seven-seat touring car.

The 30/35 HP name was used again for 1907.  With a wheelbase of 106-inches, there was a three-seat runabout and a five-seat touring car.  A longer five-seat touring car had a wheelbase of 111-inches. A wheelbase of 115-inches enabled a seven-seat touring car.  There was also a more powerful and more expensive model , the 50/70 HP.  It had a wheelbase of 124-inches and was available as an enclosed limousine with five to seven seats.

Priced at the top of the Import and luxury markets, S & M Simplex's factory prices in 1907 ran from a low of $4,950 for a runabout to a high of $6,400 for limousines.

Model overview

Production

Advertisements

External links 
 Simplex automobiles at ConceptCarz
 Smith & Mabley images at Detroit Public Library
 Smith & Mabley at Coachbuilt.com
 J. M. Quinby & Co.at Coachbuilt.com
 American Automobile.com - archived copy on S&M Simplex

References 

Defunct motor vehicle manufacturers of the United States
Defunct manufacturing companies based in New York City
Motor vehicle manufacturers based in New York (state)
1900 establishments in New York (state)
1906 disestablishments in New York (state)
Vehicle manufacturing companies established in 1902
Vehicle manufacturing companies disestablished in 1906
Cars introduced in 1902
Cars introduced in 1904
Luxury motor vehicle manufacturers
Luxury vehicles
Veteran vehicles
Brass Era vehicles
1900s cars